Hydriomena costipunctata is a species of moth in the family Geometridae first described by William Barnes and James Halliday McDunnough in 1912. It is found in North America.

The MONA or Hodges number for Hydriomena costipunctata is 7260.

References

Further reading

 
 

Hydriomena
Articles created by Qbugbot
Moths described in 1912